The Western District Public Cargo Working Area, commonly nicknamed the Instagram Pier, is a pier located on the waterfront of Sai Wan, Hong Kong. Originally a container terminal, the cargo dock has become a popular attraction and location for photographers. The Instagram Pier is well known by the public because of its clear view of Victoria Harbour, a major tourist attraction in Hong Kong. From the Instagram Pier, views like that of the Hong Kong skyline, sunsets, old lamp posts, caution barriers, cargo pallets, etc. can be captured.

The public cargo working area gained its nickname due to the huge amount of Instagram posts taken in this working area, giving it its informal nickname of the "Instagram Pier". It has subsequently gained a large amount of media coverage.

History

The Instagram Pier was originally mainly for freighting, and has been known as the Western District Public Cargo Working Area. It is one of the six public cargo working areas managed by Hong Kong's Marine Department. With the replacement of small and medium-sized freight companies by large transportation corporations, the usage of the Western District Public Cargo Working Area has become more infrequent. With the lack of amusement parks in the Western District, people began to occupy the area for walking dogs or even fishing. Starting from around 2010, it has been known for its scenery for watching the sunset which makes it a good place for photos.

The area has become a popular place for witnessing sunsets and shooting photos. The picturesque surrounding area seen from the pier has taken on the nickname – "Mirror of the Sky", since many photographs are taken of the reflective shoreline there. The name refers to the natural phenomenon of reflections seen on the unusually thick layer of water remaining on the ground after rainfall. The water clearly reflects the sky, and shadows of people and objects standing on the horizon. Sunsets often add a stunning effect to this phenomenon.

In 2013, the Instagram Pier won in the "Outstanding Public Space Elections," jointly organised by Designing Hong Kong, Hong Kong Public Space Initiative and other groups. While the Instagram Pier received the highest number of votes in that election, it is technically not a public place. In fact, the Marine Department has posted warning notices at the pier entrance, citing public safety regulations. Only those engaged in loading and unloading operations are officially allowed at the pier.

After the introduction of the West Island line in the MTR in the first quarter of 2015, the pier has become more famous. In addition, the exposure on social media has attracted even more visitors, especially those from overseas. The end of the work day at the pier is the perfect timing for sunset. Photographers often line up with their tripods waiting for the sun to fall on the horizon line.

On March 1, 2021, the Marine Department used the epidemic as a reason to prohibit the public from freely entering the Instagram Pier except staff.

Potential dismantling

Due to a lack of railings for protection, there is a potential danger of falling into the ocean. There have been accidents at the pier, making it possible that the site will have to be closed. The Hong Kong government suggested renovating the whole pier for town planning. It planned to build extra railings and construct landmark buildings at the tip of the extended part. In addition, parts of the site might be re-established as a waterfront promenade. The planning generally included railings for the pier, and it would be transferred to the Leisure and Cultural Services Department for administration.

In the middle of 2015, a Hong Kong newspaper office exposed the news about this town planning, which received a large amount of negative feedback from residents. Afterward, the District Council denied the possibility of this project. However, the government has not forgotten the project. It has still been persuading the operators to leave their berths in order to build the waterfront promenade. On the other hand, the society has been considering other options for this project. It plans to rebuild the surfaces of Fung Mat Road, Shing Sai Road eastbound, and parts of the Western District Public Cargo Working Area as a waterfront promenade and cycle track; these works would be separated by railings or dividing lines.

In 2017, the Government of Hong Kong published their policy address in October, amending plans to portion off 7500 square metres (over 70%) of the "Instagram Pier" to be converted into a community garden. This sparked widespread criticism, and concern groups protested against this decision.

See also
 Piers in Hong Kong

References

External links 
 #InstagramPier hashtag Explore page on Instagram
 Map from the Marine Department of Hong Kong

Further reading 

 B. Pong, Unfolding the Western District Public Cargo Working Area in Hong Kong, 2017. An introductory text in the Harvard University Graduate School of Design website.

Sai Wan
Piers in China
Pier
Transport infrastructure in Hong Kong